The Dance Party is an American pop rock band from Washington, DC.

History

Formation, EP, Friction! Friction Friction!
The Dance Party was formed in 2005 in College Park, Maryland by vocalist Mick Coogan, guitarist Kevin Bayly, drummer Jeff David, and bassist Danny Hoag, and soon released their first EP, The Dance Party EP. After building a reputation in the D.C. area and throughout the Mid-Atlantic for wild partying and huge, over-the-top live performances, The Dance Party self-released their full-length record Friction! Friction! Friction! in July 2007. In late 2007, the band rounded out their live show by adding keyboardist Drew Doucette of Beauty Pill as a full-time member.

Tigers EP

In 2008, the band recorded an unreleased full-length record with Andros Rodriguez which was later released as the five-song EP Tigers in a limited pressing containing the song "Sasha Don't Sleep." On November 14, 2011, the band announced that Tigers would be released in its entirety on December 23, 2011.

Music from Tigers has been featured on such television series as The Jersey Shore, The Real World, and Keeping Up with the Kardashians.

After the departure of David and Hoag in early 2009, the band added former Driving East drummer Jon Jester and bassist Rishi Chakrabarty to the line up.

Touch

In 2009, the band signed with HellYa! Records/Atlantic Records and moved to Los Angeles, CA to record their major label debut with producers Warren Huart, Luke Walker, and Julian Bunetta. The album was mixed by Tim Palmer at '62 Studios 

During the production of Touch, both Doucette and Chakrabarty left the band. After auditioning and performing with a series of new bassists, Dave "Moose" Kuehl joined the lineup in February 2010, just before the band's series of performances at SXSW 2010. Leading up to the release of Touch, the band embarked on a national tour, playing select dates with Atomic Tom. On September 28, 2010, The Dance Party released "Touch" as their first mainstream studio album.

In October 2010, The Dance Party played CMJ.

In January 2011, The Dance Party went on a bicoastal North American tour with Wallpaper. and K.Flay.

In 2011, The Dance Party played all 44 dates of the Vans Warped Tour, personally invited by tour founder Kevin Lyman to perform on the Kevin Says Stage.

Tigers (2011)

On November 14, 2011, The Dance Party announced that a full, ten-song version of Tigers would be released on December 23, 2011, beginning with the digital release of "Sing Your Song" on November 18, 2011. This album will be composed of archival material recorded from 2008 to 2009.

Brett (2011-present)
After the release of Tigers, the band announced a temporary name change to Brett due to the difference in sound of their newly written sounds. They reassured that the Dance Party was not finished, only temporarily changed. After periodically releasing songs under this name, Brett will release their self-titled debut album on May 20, 2014 through Cascine Records.

Members
Mick Coogan – Vocals, Synthesizers
Kevin Bayly – Guitars, Synthesizers, Programming
Jon Jester – Drums
David "Moose" Kuehl – Bass

Discography

Albums
Friction! Friction! Friction! (2007)
Touch (2010)
Tigers (2011)
Brett (2014) (As Brett)
Mode (2016)

EPs
The Dance Party EP (2005)
Tigers (2009)

References

External links
 The Dance Party on Myspace.com
 Friction! Friction! Friction! from Dischord.com

American pop rock music groups